The Zürau Aphorisms are 109 aphorisms of Franz Kafka, written from September 1917 to April 1918 and published by his friend Max Brod in 1931, after his death. They are selected from his writing in Zürau in West Bohemia (now Siřem in the community of Blšany) where he stayed with his sister Ottla, suffering from tuberculosis. His friend Max Brod titled the book "Betrachtungen über Sünde, Hoffnung, Leid und den wahren Weg" (Reflections on Sin, Hope, Suffering, and the True Way).

Origin 

After he was diagnosed with tuberculosis in August 1917, in order to recover, Kafka moved for a few months to the Bohemian village of Zürau, where his sister Ottla worked on the farm of her brother-in-law Hermann. He felt very comfortable there and later described his time there as perhaps the best in his life, probably because he had no responsibilities to work, parents and women.

Kafka had decided not to do literary work there. However, he kept diaries and "Oktavhefte". From the notes in these books Kafka extracted 109 numbered pieces of text on "Zettel", single pieces of paper in no given order. These aphorisms were first published in 1931 by Kiepenheuer & Witsch, under the title Brod had chosen: "Betrachtungen über Sünde, Hoffnung, Leid und den wahren Weg" (Reflections on Sin, Hope, Suffering, and the True Way).

Content 

The aphorisms are strict reflections on metaphysical topics, dealing with good and evil, truth and falsehood, alienation and redemption, death and paradise. They are Kafka's only texts dealing directly with theological issues. The philosophical reflections are inspired by the world of ideas of Schopenhauer, namely Die Welt als Wille und Vorstellung (The World as Will and Representation), as well as Kierkegaard's interpretations of the fall of man.

The individual aphorisms are not related to each other; some have a narrative character, others present images or parables.

Reception 

Peter-André Alt notes in his biography: "Again, the negative dimension of Kafka's life term is visible, which remains supported by the view that the individual must inevitably be caught up in self-deception, lies and deceit, if it seeks to improve its earthly situation."

Reiner Stach remarks: "Much remains fragmentary: again and again, scattered sentences that trail off into nothingness, between them formulations that erupt like aphorisms, imagistic and compelling, once more interrupted by searching motions, diffuse and breaking off unmediated — which Kafka rigidly separates from each other with slashes."

In a review of a 2012 edition of facsimiles of the Zürau Aphorisms, Friedmann Apel sees wording similar to the later novel The Castle, which seems often to be addressing Kafka's father. He quotes the aphorism printed first in Brod's book: "Der wahre Weg geht über ein Seil, das nicht in der Höhe gespannt ist, sondern knapp über dem Boden. Es scheint mehr bestimmt stolpern zu machen als begangen zu werden." (The true way goes via a rope, which is suspended not high up but just above the ground. It seems designed more to make one stumble than to be walked.) He points out, that right after evoking an artist on his way to truth, full of danger, Kafka turns to the small scale, even to humor. Apel sees here and in other aphorisms refined deconstructions of certainties ("raffinierte Dekonstruktionen von Gewissheiten").

Editions 
 Franz Kafka. Die Zürauer Aphorismen. ed. Roberto Calasso, Suhrkamp Verlag, 2006, .
 Franz Kafka. Nachgelassene Schriften und Fragmente II. ed. Jost Schillemeit, S. Fischer, Frankfurt am Main 2002, pp. 113–140.
 Roland Reuß: Zürauer Zettel. 106 Zettel auf Einzelblättern, Stroemfeld Verlag, Frankfurt am Main, 2012.

References

Literature 
 Roberto Calasso: Die verhängte Herrlichkeit in Franz Kafka. Die Zürauer Aphorismen.
 Peter-André Alt: Franz Kafka: Der ewige Sohn. Eine Biographie. Verlag C.H. Beck, München 2005, 
 Reiner Stach: Kafka: Die Jahre der Erkenntnis, S. Fischer, 
 Harald Münster: Das Buch als Axt. Franz Kafka differenztheoretisch lesen. Peter Lang, Frankfurt a.M. 2011, p. 59-73, .

External links 

 Ben McFry: Finding and Following the True Way: Franz Kafka's Zürau Aphorisms thesis, Shorter College, Athens, Georgia 2007

Books by Franz Kafka
1931 non-fiction books
Kiepenheuer & Witsch books
Books published posthumously
Books of aphorisms